Glyphodes desmialis is a moth in the family Crambidae. It was described by Paul Mabille in 1900. The type locality is unknown, but it is thought to originate from mainland Africa or Madagascar.

References

Moths described in 1900
Glyphodes